The 2016–17 NCAA Division I women's basketball season began on November 11, 2016 and ended with the Final Four title game in Dallas on April 2, 2017, won by South Carolina. Practices officially began on September 30, 2016.

Season headlines
 April 20 – The NCAA announced its Academic Progress Rate (APR) sanctions for the 2016–17 school year. A total of 23 Division I programs in 13 sports were declared ineligible for postseason play due to failure to meet the required APR benchmark, with Southern being the only women's basketball team so penalized.
 April 28 – The Atlantic Sun Conference announced that effective with the 2016–17 school year, it would rebrand itself as the ASUN Conference.
 November 2 – The Associated Press preseason All-American team was released. South Carolina forward A'ja Wilson was the leading vote-getter (32 votes). Joining her on the team were Ohio State guard Kelsey Mitchell (31 votes), Notre Dame forward Brianna Turner (29), Baylor forward Nina Davis and Washington guard Kelsey Plum.
 November 23 – In what ESPN called "one of the most bizarre scenarios imaginable at a major sporting event", top-ranked Notre Dame and Louisiana–Lafayette used two different venues during Notre Dame's 91–51 win. The game began at Campbell Center, a high school venue in Houston, but a power outage during the second quarter prompted the teams to complete the game at another venue. Rice, whose women's team had just completed a home game, offered its Tudor Fieldhouse, and the two teams bused to that venue and finished the game there.
 December 5 – The ASUN Conference announced that North Alabama would move from the Division II Gulf South Conference and join the ASUN in 2018.
 January 7 – A bench-clearing brawl broke out during the third quarter of the UNLV–Utah State game after a UNLV player was fouled. Four players from each team were ejected. Three days later, the Mountain West Conference, home to both schools, issued one-game suspensions to three participants in the brawl (two from UNLV and one from Utah State) and reprimanded six other participants.
 January 13 – The Western Athletic Conference announced that California Baptist would move from the Division II Pacific West Conference and join the WAC in 2018.
 January 26 – The Summit League announced that North Dakota, then a member of the Big Sky Conference, would join the league in 2018.
 February 2 – The Colonial Athletic Association announced that two conference wins by Charleston would be treated as Charleston losses for purposes of seeding in the conference tournament, though it did not (and could not) reverse the results. The conference confirmed that the Cougars had provided "improperly sized" basketballs in the two games, though it would not confirm that men's basketballs were used instead of women's balls.

Milestones and records
 December 8 – In Ohio State's 108–73 win over Southern, the Buckeyes' Kelsey Mitchell became the fastest Division I women's player to reach 2,000 career points, reaching the mark in her 79th game. The previous record of 82 was held by Missouri State's Jackie Stiles.
 December 11 – Kelsey Plum became the all-time leading scorer in Pac-12 Conference history (for either women or men), passing the former record of Stanford's Chiney Ogwumike during Washington's 92–66 win over Boise State.
 December 16 – Baylor defeated Winthrop 140–32, setting a new Division I women's basketball record for victory margin.
 January 10 – UConn crushed South Florida 102–37 to give the Huskies their 90th straight win, equaling the program's own record for the longest winning streak by a Division I team of either sex.
 January 13 – Plum became the 12th player in Division I women's history with 3,000 career points during Washington's 90–73 win over Arizona.
 January 14 – UConn defeated SMU 88–48 for its 91st straight win, establishing a new Division I record streak.
 February 3 – Stanford defeated USC 58–42, giving Cardinal head coach Tara VanDerveer her 1,000th career win. She joined late Tennessee head coach Pat Summitt and current Duke men's head coach Mike Krzyzewski as the only Division I coaches at that time to reach the milestone.
 February 13 – UConn extended its record winning streak to 100 games with a 66–55 win over South Carolina.
 February 25 – Plum scored 57 points, a school record for either sex, in Washington's 84–77 win over Utah, surpassing Stiles for the top spot on the all-time NCAA Division I women's career scoring list.
 March 6 – In the American Athletic Conference tournament final, UConn's Katie Lou Samuelson made all 10 of her three-point attempts, setting a new women's Division I record for most consecutive three-pointers in a game. The Huskies blasted South Florida 100–44 to enter the NCAA Tournament unbeaten.
 March 18 – In the first round of the NCAA tournament, Texas A&M came back from a 21-point deficit early in the fourth quarter, ending on a 25–1 run to defeat Penn 63–61. This set a new record for largest comeback in the Division I women's tournament, surpassing the previous record of 16 points by Notre Dame in 2001 and Michigan State in 2005.
 March 19 – In the same round, Baylor set two all-time tournament records in its 119–30 pasting of Texas Southern:
 The 89-point margin was the largest ever, surpassing the previous record of 74 set by Tennessee against North Carolina A&T in 1994.
 Baylor's 119 points were the most ever scored in regulation, surpassing the previous record of 116 set by Ohio State in 1998 and equaled twice by UConn, including earlier that same day.
 March 21 – In the second round of the NCAA tournament, Plum surpassed Stiles' D-I record for points in a season, scoring 38  in the Huskies' 108–82 win over Oklahoma and finishing the game with 1,080 points on the season. Plum eventually finished with 1,109 points on the season and 3,527 for her career.
 March 31 – UConn's record winning streak ended at 111 games with a 66–64 overtime loss to Mississippi State on a buzzer-beater by the Bulldogs' Morgan William.

Coaching wins milestones
 1000 victories - Tara VanDerveer, Stanford, February 3 versus USC.
 600 victories - Gordy Presnell, Boise State, December 18 versus Portland.
 500 victories - Jeff Mittie, Kansas State, December 4 versus Omaha.
 500 victories - Sandra Rushing, Central Arkansas, February 11 versus Nicholls.
 500 victories - Kim Mulkey, Baylor, February 25 versus Texas Tech.

Conference membership changes

Only one school joined a new conference for 2016–17:

Pre-season polls

The top 25 from the AP and USA Today Coaches Polls.

New arenas
 South Dakota opened the new Sanford Coyote Sports Center. The completion of the 6,000-seat venue saw the South Dakota men's basketball, women's basketball, and women's volleyball teams move out of the considerably larger DakotaDome, which remains home to football, track & field, and swimming & diving. The first women's basketball game in the new arena was the opening leg of a November 13 doubleheader with the men's team, with the Coyotes defeating Stephen F. Austin 80–74.
 North Dakota State opened the renovated Scheels Center. This completion brought the previously outdated Bison Sports Arena up to full Division 1 standards. The arena resumed competition of their men's basketball, women's basketball, and wrestling teams inside the Scheels Center. The renovated arena seats 5,700 people on the North side of NDSU's campus in Fargo, North Dakota. The first women's game played in the renovated arena was an exhibition on November 3, 2016 against NCAA Division II Bemidji State, the Bison winning that game 79-59. The first official women's game was on November 12, 2016; the Bison beat Dickinson State University 70-63.

In addition, Alabama returned women's home games to Coleman Coliseum, home to Alabama men's basketball since the venue's opening in 1968. The Crimson Tide women began play in 1974 at Foster Auditorium, and split home games between the two facilities until moving full-time into the Coliseum in 1981. The women would move back to Foster near the end of the 2010–11 season, and used that as their main venue until returning to the Coliseum.

This proved to be the final season for four Division I teams in their then-current venues.
 DePaul left its current on-campus home of McGrath–Phillips Arena for the new off-campus Wintrust Arena, a 10,000-seat venue that opened in October 2017 at the McCormick Place convention center on Chicago's Near South Side. The new arena also houses the DePaul men's team.
 NJIT left one on-campus venue for another. The aging Fleisher Center (capacity 1,600) was replaced by the Wellness and Events Center (capacity 3,500) for the 2017–18 season.
 Robert Morris closed the Charles L. Sewall Center, home to the Colonials since 1985, in June 2017. The UPMC Events Center is currently being built at the Sewall Center site and is scheduled to open in the middle of the 2018–19 basketball season. Until that time, the Colonials are playing at the Student Recreation and Fitness Center, which was built at the school's North Athletic Complex as part of the UPMC Events Center project and opened in September 2017.
 Wofford also moved within its campus, going from Benjamin Johnson Arena (capacity 3,500) to the slightly smaller Jerry Richardson Indoor Stadium (capacity 3,400).

Regular season

Early preseason tournament

Tournament upsets
For this list, an "upset" is defined as a win by a team seeded 7 or more spots below its defeated opponent.

Conference winners and tournaments
Each of the 32 Division I athletic conferences ends its regular season with a single-elimination tournament. The team with the best regular-season record in each conference is given the number one seed in each tournament, with tiebreakers used as needed in the case of ties for the top seeding. The winners of these tournaments receive automatic invitations to the 2017 NCAA Division I women's basketball tournament. This will be the first season in which the Ivy League holds a conference tournament.

Award winners

All-America teams

The NCAA has never recognized a consensus All-America team in women's basketball. This differs from the practice in men's basketball, in which the NCAA uses a combination of selections by the  Associated Press (AP), the National Association of Basketball Coaches (NABC), the Sporting News, and the United States Basketball Writers Association (USBWA) to determine a consensus All-America team. The selection of a consensus team is possible because all four organizations select at least a first and second team, with only the USBWA not selecting a third team.

However, of the major selectors in women's basketball, only the AP divides its selections into separate teams. The women's counterpart to the NABC, the Women's Basketball Coaches Association (WBCA), selects a single 10-member (plus ties) team, as does the USBWA. The NCAA does not recognize Sporting News as an All-America selector in women's basketball.

Major player of the year awards
Wooden Award: Kelsey Plum, Washington
Naismith Award: Kelsey Plum, Washington
Associated Press Player of the Year: Kelsey Plum, Washington
Wade Trophy: Kelsey Plum, Washington
Ann Meyers Drysdale Women's Player of the Year (USBWA): Kelsey Plum, Washington
espnW National Player of the Year: Kelsey Plum, Washington

Major freshman of the year awards
USBWA National Freshman of the Year: Sabrina Ionescu, Oregon
 WBCA Freshman of the Year (inaugural award): Destiny Slocum, Maryland
 espnW Freshman of the Year: Sabrina Ionescu, Oregon

Major coach of the year awards
Associated Press Coach of the Year: Geno Auriemma, Connecticut
Naismith College Coach of the Year: Geno Auriemma, Connecticut
WBCA National Coach of the Year: Geno Auriemma, Connecticut

Other major awards
Nancy Lieberman Award: Kelsey Plum, Washington
 WBCA Defensive Player of the Year: Gabby Williams, Connecticut
Senior CLASS Award: Sydney Wiese, Oregon State
Maggie Dixon Award (top rookie head coach): Shauna Green, Dayton
Academic All-American of the Year (top scholar-athlete): Ally Disterhoft, Iowa
Elite 90 Award (top GPA among upperclass players at Final Four): Brittany McPhee, Stanford
Pat Summitt Most Courageous Award: Angel Elderkin, head coach, Appalachian State & Holly Rowe, broadcaster, ESPN

Conference standings

Coaching changes
Several teams changed coaches during and after the season.

See also

2016–17 NCAA Division I men's basketball season

Footnotes

References